TV Nova was a local television channel in Kumanovo, North Macedonia. Their director was Marjan Stoshevski. TV Nova was robbed in 2012 and lost some of its equipment but it did not interfere with the work of the station.

See also
Television in North Macedonia

References

External links
 

Television channels in North Macedonia
Mass media in Kumanovo